The 2008–09 Principality Premiership was the fourteenth Principality Premiership season and the fifth under its current format. The season began in September 2008 and ended in May 2009. Fourteen teams played each other on a home and away basis, with teams earning four points for a win, and a bonus point for scoring four or more tries in a match. The losing team may also earn a bonus point if they lose by seven points or less.

The fourteen teams competing were Aberavon RFC, Bedwas RFC, Bridgend Ravens, Cardiff RFC, Cross Keys RFC, Ebbw Vale RFC, Glamorgan Wanderers RFC, Llandovery RFC, Llanelli RFC, Neath RFC, Newport RFC, Pontypool RFC, Pontypridd RFC, Swansea RFC.

Stadia

Table

Fixtures & results

Week 1

Week 2

Week 3

Week 4

Week 5

Week 6

Week 7

Week 8

Week 9

Week 10

Week 11

Week 12

Week 13

Week 14

Week 15

Week 16

Week 17

Week 18

Week 19

Week 20

Week 21

Week 22

Week 23

Week 24

Week 25

Week 26

Week 27

Welsh Premier Division seasons
2008–09 in Welsh rugby union
Wales